Atlético Huila is a professional Colombian football team based in Neiva, that currently plays in the Categoría Primera B. The club was founded on November 29, 1990, making it one of the youngest professional football clubs in Colombia. The club's best seasons came in the late 2000s; they finished runners-up in 2007 and again in 2009. They play their home games at the Guillermo Plazas Alcid stadium, which has a capacity of 27,000. Huila has a long-standing rivalry with Deportes Tolima, known as the Tolima Grande derby. The club has a futsal team named Ultrahuilca Coomotor.

History
The club was founded in November 1990 and was admitted into the Primera B tournament the following year. In 1992, Alberto Rujana was appointed as manager. That same season, the club purchased midfielder Guillermo Berrío from America de Cali; Rujana named him captain and made him the centerpiece of the squad. Immediate promotion followed. The club managed to last in the top flight until the end of the 1996–97 season, when they finished last in the relegation table and were sent back to Primera B.

Rafael Corrales took over the club in 1996–97, and led them to an immediate promotion back to the top flight. The club managed to consolidate itself in the league, although relegation was a constant danger. Huila escaped relegation only on goal differential in 2002 and had to win a relegation playoff against Valledupar in 2006. This was why the club's performance in 2007 was almost entirely unexpected.

Under the management of Néstor Otero, the club finished third in the Apertura and qualified for the semifinal phase. They further surprised by winning their semifinal group (beating Millonarios on the final day of the round robin) to reach the Apertura finals, where they were beaten by Atlético Nacional 2–1 over two legs. A similarly unexpected result came in the second half of the 2009 season (Finalización tournament), when the club finished third in the first stage and topped its semifinal group. Once again they were beaten in the finals, this time by Independiente Medellín by a 3–2 aggregate score. The strong performance in the 2009 season allowed Atlético Huila to qualify for the following year's Copa Sudamericana for the first time in history, in which they beat Venezuelan team Trujillanos in the first stage, but were knocked out by San José from Bolivia in the second stage.

The club placed first in the first stage of the 2015 Torneo Apertura, however they were eliminated in the quarterfinals by Deportes Tolima. 

After 22 years in the top flight, Atlético Huila were relegated back to the second tier at the end of the 2019 season, finishing in last place of both the relegation table and the year's aggregate table. Their relegation was confirmed on the last day of the regular season with a 1–0 defeat against Jaguares, who were also involved in the relegation struggle.

Following their return to Primera B, Atlético Huila won the 2020 tournament, which did not grant promotion for the following season given that promotion and relegation were postponed for six months due to the effects of the COVID-19 pandemic in Colombia, however they were able to seal their promotion back to Primera A by beating Deportes Quindío, winners of the first tournament of the 2021 season, in a double-legged Grand Final.

Honours

Categoría Primera A:
Runners-up (2): 2007–I, 2009–II

Categoría Primera B:
Winners (3): 1992, 1997, 2020
Runners-up (1): 2022

Performance in CONMEBOL competitions
Copa CONMEBOL: 1 appearance
1999: First Round
Copa Sudamericana: 1 appearance
2010: Second Round

Players

Current squad

Out on loan

Notable players

 Guillermo Berrío (1992–96), (1998), (2003–04)
 Fredy Montero (2006–07)
 Rodrigo Marangoni (2006–08)
 Víctor Guazá (2007), (2008–10)
 Lewis Ochoa (2008–09)
 Gabriel Torres (2009)
 Iván Velásquez (2009–10)
 Nicolás Ayr (2009–11)
 Amílcar Henríquez (2009–12)
 Carlos Carbonero (2010)
 Daniel Bocanegra (2010–12)
 Rafael Castillo (2010)
 Andrés Andrade (2011)
 Jimmy Bermúdez (2011)
 Sebastián Hernández (2011–12)
 Nelson Barahona (2012)
 Alejandro Vélez (2012)
 Hernán Hechalar (2014)
 Juan Fernando Caicedo (2014)

Managers

 Víctor Quiñónez (1991)
 Alberto Rujana (1992–95)
 Nelson Abadía (1996)
 Rafael Corrales (1997–99)
 Nelson Gallego (2000)
 Jairo Silva Quiza (interim) (2000)
 Juan Eugenio Jiménez (2001–02)
 Bernardo Redín (2002–03)
 Félix Valverde Quiñonez (2004)
 Bernardo Redín (2005)
 Néstor Otero (2006–07)
  (2007–08)
 Miguel Augusto Prince (2009)
 Guillermo Berrío (2009–11)
 Néstor Otero (2011–12)
  (2012–13)
 Javier Álvarez Arteaga (2013)
 Virgilio Puerto (2013–14)
 Fernando Castro (2014)
 José Santa (2015–16)
 Oswaldo Durán (2016)
 Virgilio Puerto (2016)
 Jorge Vivaldo (2017)
 Néstor Craviotto (2017–)

Women

Atlético Huila Femenino is the women's section of Atlético Huila. They participate in the Colombian Women's Football League organized by Dimayor, the top level women's football league in Colombia.

Atlético Huila won the league championship in 2018, having finished runner-up in the previous season. That same year, they also won the Copa Libertadores Femenina, thus becoming the first Colombian team to win the continental club competition. In 2020, the team entered a hiatus when it withdrew from the domestic league owing to financial reasons. They returned to the league for the 2022 season.

References

External links

 Official website 

 
Football clubs in Colombia
Association football clubs established in 1990
1990 establishments in Colombia
Categoría Primera A clubs
Categoría Primera B clubs